The Great Mosque is a Sunni Islamic mosque located in Aqrah, Duhok Governorate, Iraq. It is one of the oldest and grandest mosques in Iraq.

History
The mosque was first founded after the spread of Islam in Iraqi Kurdistan, during the era of the second Caliph Umar. Today, the mosque has an area of  after several renovations and reconstructions. The latest renovation was in 1965, carried out by the ministry of endowment and religious affairs with the help of locals and ulamas. There are several madrasas and religious institutions surrounding the mosque which offer diplomas. One of them is managed by Sayeed Munib Ahmad al-Imam, and the other is managed by Sheikh Abdullah Ahmad Muhammad. These religious institutions as well as the mosque are often visited places for religious leaders for its historical significance.

See also

 Islam in Iraq
 List of mosques in Iraq

References

7th-century mosques
Mosques in Iraq
Sunni mosques in Iraq